Bihymena is a monotypic moth genus of the family Noctuidae erected by Herbert Beck in 1996. Its only species, Bihymena hymenaea, was first described by Ignaz Schiffermüller in 1775.

References

Catocalinae